Thomas Joseph Beutler (born September 29, 1946) is a former American football player. 

Beutler was born in Bluffton, Ohio, and attended Catholic Central High School in Toledo, Ohio. He played college football for the Toledo Rockets from 1964 to 1967. Toledo coach Frank Lauterbur called him "the finest lineman I ever coached."

Beutler was selected by the Cleveland Browns in the 12th round of the 1968 NFL Draft by the Cleveland Browns. He tried out with the Browns in 1968 but was relegated to the reserve squad after sustaining a hamstring injury. He returned to the practice squad again in 1969 after pulling as stomach muscle. In 1970, he survived the final cuts and played as a middle linebacker for the Browns, appearing in four games.  Prior to the 1971 season, the Browns traded Beutler to the Baltimore Colts. At Baltimore, he played mostly on special teams and earned a reputation as a hard tackler. He appearing in four games. During the 1970 and 1971 seasons, he appeared in eight NFL games, five of them as a starter. 

Beutler also played for the Memphis Southmen in the World Football League in 1974. He announced his retirement from professional football in June 1975.

References

1946 births
Living people
American football linebackers
Cleveland Browns players
Baltimore Colts players
Memphis Southmen players
Toledo Rockets football players
Players of American football from Ohio
People from Bluffton, Ohio